Rodan is a male name. Its name day is celebrated on December 21 (Noel), or March 15 (Slovak calendar).

Rodan is a Slavonic name related to the adjective native, nativity.

References 
Miloslava Knappová, Jak se bude vaše dítě jmenovat?

Slavic masculine given names